The Order of Liberation is a French Order which was awarded to heroes of the Liberation of France during World War II. It is a very high honour, second only after the Légion d’Honneur (Legion of Honour). Very few people, military units and communes were ever awarded it; and only for their deeds during World War II. A different order, the Médaille de la Résistance ("Resistance Medal"), was created and awarded for lesser but still distinguished deeds by members of the Resistance.

History 
The Order of Liberation was established by General de Gaulle in order n° 7, signed on 16 November 1940 in Brazzaville, the capital of France Libre from 1940 to 1943. The object of the Order was to "reward people, of the military or civilian communities, who will have distinguished themselves in the task of liberating France and her Empire".

There were no restrictions as to age, sex, rank, origin or nationality; nor any regarding the nature of the deeds, other than their exceptional quality.

The Order has a single rank, the title of Compagnon de la Libération ("Companion of the Liberation"). General de Gaulle, founder of the Order, was the only Grand Maître ("Grand Master") of the Order.

The Order was usually bestowed by the traditional French military ceremony of "prise d'armes". The recipient was summoned forward by rank and name, and given the insignia while being commended thus: Nous vous reconnaissons comme notre Compagnon pour la libération de la France dans l’honneur et par la Victoire (“We acknowledge you as our companion for the Liberation of France, in honour and by Victory”).

The last awards to French citizens, units and communes were made on 23 January 1946. Awards to foreign nationals were made until 1960.

The last living Companion, Hubert Germain, died in 2021 aged 101. He was buried in the crypt of the Memorial to Fighting France, where a tomb was set aside for the last Companion.

Award description 
The medal of the Order is called the Croix de la Libération ("Cross of Liberation"). It is a 31 mm wide by 33 mm high rectangular bronze shield bearing a 60 mm high vertical gladius on its obverse. On the blade of the gladius: a black enamelled Cross of Lorraine (symbol of the Free French Forces). On the reverse, in Latin: a relief inscription in bold letters on four rows, PATRIAM SERVANDO VICTORIAM TULIT ("By serving the Fatherland, he/she achieved Victory").

The award is suspended by a rectangular loop through the hilt of the gladius to a 36 mm wide silk moiré green ribbon with 4 mm wide black edge stripes and 1 mm wide black longitudinal stripes, 11 mm from the edges. Green represents hope, black represents mourning, symbolizing the state of France in 1940. The ribbon at first had diagonal black stripes, but the Order was only awarded in that form during August–September 1942.

Recipients 
The individuals, units and communities listed below were awarded the Order of Liberation

A total of 1,061 Crosses of Liberation were awarded:

 1,038 to individuals;
 18 to units of the Army, Air Force and Navy;
 Five to cities: Nantes, Grenoble, Paris, Vassieux-en-Vercors, and l’Île de Sein.

Individual recipients 

Amongst the 1,036 Companions of the Order, 65 were killed before the end of the war (8 May 1945) and another 260 received the distinction posthumously. Members of the French resistance, especially the more famous ones, often received the Order under their nom de guerre.

Seven women were awarded the title:
 Andree Peel
 Berty Albrecht, co-founder of the movement Combat, who died in the prison of Fresnes in 1943
 Laure Diebold, liaison agent of the "Mithridate" network and secretary to Jean Moulin, deported.
 Marie Hackin, died at sea in February 1941 on a mission
 Marcelle Henry of the VIC escape network, died shortly after returning from deportation
 Simone Michel-Lévy, of the Postmen Resistance, died while deported
 Émilienne Moreau-Evrard, hero of the First World War, agent for the "Brutus" network and later member of the Provisional Consultative Assembly

Nearly 10% of the recipients of the Order were younger than 20 at the beginning of the war. The youngest, Mathurin Henrio, was 14 when he was shot dead by Nazi officers for refusing to answer questions on the whereabouts of Maquisards.

The Order was re-opened twice to honour foreign personalities who helped liberate France:

 Former Prime Minister Winston Churchill (1958)
 King George VI (1960, posthumously)

Military units 
Military units as a whole have been awarded the title of Compagnon de la Libération.

On 18 June 1996, at Mont Valérien, the 18 military units which had been awarded the Cross of Liberation were given a green and black fourragère by President Jacques Chirac.

Armée de Terre 
 Bataillon de Marche n°2
 13th Foreign Legion Demi-Brigade
 Bataillon d’Infanterie de Marine et du Pacifique
 Régiment de marche du Tchad
 2nd Colonial Infantry Regiment
 1st Colonial Artillery Regiment
 1/3ème Régiment d’Artillerie Coloniale
 1st Moroccan Spahi Regiment
 501e Régiment de chars de combat

Marine 
 Sous-marin Rubis
 Corvette Aconit
 1er Régiment de Fusiliers Marins

Armée de l’Air 
 1ère Escadrille de Chasse
 Régiment de Chasse Normandie-Niemen
 2ème Régiment de Chasseurs Parachutistes de l’Armée de l’Air
 Groupe de Bombardement Lorraine
 Groupe de Chasse Ile-de-France
 Groupe de Chasse Alsace

Cities 
 Nantes: awarded on 11 November 1941

Heroic city which, since the crime of capitulation, has opposed a fierce resistance to any sort of collaboration with the enemy. Occupied by German troops and subjected to the harshest of repression, has given to the French, by numerous individual and collective actions, a magnificent example of courage and fidelity. By the blood of her martyred children, showed to the whole World the French will for national liberation.

 Grenoble: awarded on 4 May 1944

Heroic city at the vanguard of the French Resistance and of the fight for liberation. Draped in her pride, despite the arrest and the massacre of her best sons, put up a fierce fight to the Germans at every instant. Despising the interdictions given by the invaders and their accomplices, demonstrated on 11 November 1943 her certainty of Victory and her will to take part in it. On 14 November, and on 2 December 1943, responded to the reprisals and the execution of the chiefs of the Resistance movements by the destruction of the ammunition depot, barracks, power plants and factories used by the enemy. Has served the Motherland well.

 Paris: awarded on 24 March 1945

Capital faithful to herself and to France, demonstrated, under the enemy occupation and oppression, and in spite of the voices of abandonment and treason, her unshakable resolution to fight on and to win. By her courage in the presence of the invader and by the indomitable energy with which she sustained the harshest of trials, deserved to remain as an example for the entire Nation. On 19 August, in cooperation with the Allied and French armies, stood up to drive away the enemy through a series of glorious fights which began in the Cité and swiftly spread to all points of the city. In spite of heavy losses sustained by the French Forces of the Interior fighting within her, liberated itself through her own efforts and, united with the vanguard of the French Army that came to her rescue, has, on 25 August, reduced the German to his last stands and made him capitulate.

 Vassieux-en-Vercors: awarded on 4 August 1945

Village of the Vercors which, thanks to the patriotism of her inhabitants, totally sacrificed herself for the cause of the French Resistance in 1944. Main parachuting centre for the Allied air force on the plateau, always helped by all means possible the military of the Maquis in the gathering of arms. Violently bombed on 14 July, attacked by 24 German gliders on 21 and 22 July, had 72 of her inhabitants massacred and the entirety of her houses burned down by a merciless enemy. Martyr of her faith in the resurrection of the Motherland.

 l’Ile de Sein: awarded on 1 January 1946

Confronted by the enemy invasion, refused to abandon the battlefield which is hers: the Sea. Sent all of her children to fight under the flag of Free France, becoming the example and symbol of all Brittany.

See also 

 Musée de l'Ordre de la Libération
 List of Companions of the Liberation

Gallery

References

External links 

Official website of the Chancellery of the Order of the Liberation
France Phaléristique 
Winston Churchill & the Ordre de la Libération - UK Parliament Living Heritage

Civil awards and decorations of France
Companions of the Liberation
Military awards and decorations of France
Recipients of the Order of Liberation
Awards established in 1940
1940 establishments in France